Zuideramstel was from 1998 to 2010 a borough (stadsdeel) of Amsterdam, Netherlands. On 1 May 2010 it became part of the new  Amsterdam Zuid borough.

The borough had been formed in 1998 from the previous boroughs of Rivierenbuurt and Buitenveldert, with the addition of the Prinses Irenebuurt (which until then had been part of the previous Amsterdam Zuid borough).

Neighborhoods of the former borough  
 Rivierenbuurt (Scheldebuurt, IJsselbuurt and Rijnbuurt)
 Buitenveldert (Buitenveldert-West and Buitenveldert-Oost) (with the Amstelpark and the northern part of the Amsterdamse Bos)
 Prinses Irenebuurt (with the Beatrixpark)

The Zuidas business district comprises parts of the Prinses Irenebuurt, Buitenveldert and the Rivierenbuurt.

References 

Former boroughs of Amsterdam
Amsterdam-Zuid